Gondwana Research is a peer-reviewed scientific journal with an "all earth science" scope and an emphasis on the origin and evolution of continents. It is part of the Elsevier group.

References

External links 
 

Geology journals
Elsevier academic journals
English-language journals